The National Book Awards are a set of United States literary prizes.

National Book Awards may also refer to:

National Novel Award (Bolivia)
National Business Book Award, Canada
Philippine National Book Awards
National Book Awards (United Kingdom)
National Outdoor Book Award, United States